Teena is a cartoon panel series and comic strip created by Hilda Terry.

Teena may also refer to:

People
Brandon Teena (1972–1993), American murder victim
Teena Marie (1956–2010), American singer, songwriter, and producer
Teena Rochfort-Smith (1861–1883), British Shakespeare scholar and philologist

Fictional characters
Teena Mulder, from The X-Files television series
Teena the Fat Lady, a Marvel Comics character

See also
Tina (disambiguation)